Tswana, also known by its native name , and previously spelled Sechuana in English, is a Bantu language spoken in Southern Africa by about 8.2 million people. It belongs to the Bantu language family within the Sotho-Tswana branch of Zone S (S.30), and is closely related to the Northern Sotho and Southern Sotho languages, as well as the Kgalagadi language and the Lozi language.

Setswana is an official language of Botswana and South Africa. It is a lingua franca in Botswana and parts of South Africa, particularly North West Province. Tswana speaking ethnic groups are found in more than two provinces of South Africa, primarily in the North West, where about four million people speak the language. An urbanised variety, which is part slang and not the formal Setswana, is known as Pretoria Sotho, and is the principal unique language of the city of Pretoria. The three South African provinces with the most speakers are Gauteng (circa 11%), Northern Cape, and North West (over 70%). Until 1994, South African Tswana people were notionally citizens of Bophuthatswana, one of the bantustans of the apartheid regime. The Setswana language in the Northwest Province has variations in which it is spoken according to the ethnic groups found in the Tswana culture (Bakgatla, Barolong, Bakwena, Batlhaping, Bahurutshe, Bafokeng, Batlokwa, Bataung, and Bapo, among others); the written language remains the same. A small number of speakers are also found in Zimbabwe (unknown number) and Namibia (about 10,000 people).

History 
The first European to describe the language was the German traveller Hinrich Lichtenstein, who lived among the Tswana people Batlhaping in 1806 although his work was not published until 1930. He mistakenly regarded Tswana as a dialect of the Xhosa, and the name that he used for the language "Beetjuana" may also have covered the Northern and Southern Sotho languages.

The first major work on Tswana was carried out by the British missionary Robert Moffat, who had also lived among the Batlhaping, and published Bechuana Spelling Book and A Bechuana Catechism in 1826. In the following years, he published several other books of the Bible, and in 1857, he was able to publish a complete translation of the Bible.

The first grammar of Tswana was published in 1833 by the missionary James Archbell although it was modelled on a Xhosa grammar. The first grammar of Tswana which regarded it as a separate language from Xhosa (but still not as a separate language from the Northern and Southern Sotho languages) was published by the French missionary, E. Casalis in 1841. He changed his mind later, and in a publication from 1882, he noted that the Northern and Southern Sotho languages were distinct from Tswana.

Solomon Plaatje, a South African intellectual and linguist, was one of the first writers to extensively write in and about the Tswana language.

Phonology

Vowels 
The vowel inventory of Tswana can be seen below.

The circumflex on e and o in general Setswana writing is only encouraged at elementary levels of education and not at upper primary or higher; usually these are written without the circumflex.

Consonants 
The consonant inventory of Tswana can be seen below.

Two more sounds, v  and 
z , exist only in loanwords.

Tswana also has three click consonants, but these are only used in interjections or ideophones, and tend only to be used by the older generation, and are therefore falling out of use. The three click consonants are the dental click , orthographically ; the lateral click , orthographically ; and the palatal click , orthographically .

There are some minor dialectal variations among the consonants between speakers of Tswana.

The consonant  can exist at the end of a word without being followed by a vowel (as in Jwaneng and Barolong Seboni).

Stress 
Stress is fixed in Tswana and thus always falls on the penult of a word, although some compounds may receive a secondary stress in the first part of the word. The syllable on which the stress falls is lengthened.

Tone 
Tswana has two tones, high and low, but the latter has a much wider distribution in words than the former. Tones are not marked orthographically, which may lead to ambiguity.

 go bua  "to speak"
 go bua  "to skin an animal"

 o bua Setswana  "He speaks Setswana"
 o bua Setswana  "You speak Setswana"

An important feature of the tones is the so-called spreading of the high tone. If a syllable bears a high tone, the following two syllables will have high tones unless they are at the end of the word.

 simolola  >  "to begin"
 simologêla  >  "to begin for/at"

Orthography

Tswana orthography is based on the Latin alphabet.

The letter š was introduced in 1937, but the corresponding sound is still sometimes written as ⟨sh⟩. The letters ⟨ê⟩ and ⟨ô⟩ are used in textbooks and language reference books, but not so much in daily standard writing.

Grammar

Nouns 
Nouns in Tswana are grouped into nine noun classes and one subclass, each having different prefixes.  The nine classes and their respective prefixes can be seen below, along with a short note regarding the common characteristics of most nouns within their respective classes.

Some nouns may be found in several classes.  For instance, many class 1 nouns are also found in class 1a, class 3, class 4, and class 5.

Further reading

References

Notes

General

External links

Peace Corps Botswana: An Introduction to the Setswana Language
Setswana: Grammar Handbook. Peace Corps Language Handbook Series

About Setswana

 
 
Sotho-Tswana languages
Subject–verb–object languages
Languages of Botswana
Languages of South Africa
Languages of Zimbabwe
Languages of Namibia